A Carretera Central is a highway.  It may refer to:

Carretera Central (Cuba), a west–east highway spanning Cuba, begun in 1927
Carretera Central (Peru), a west–east transandean highway from Lima, via La Oroya, to Pucallpa
Carretera Central (Puerto Rico), a north–south highway crossing Puerto Rico, completed in 1898